Super Junky Monkey is an all female Japanese funk metal group.

History

Beginning
Their first release was in 1994: a live recording called Cabbage, originally released as an audio recording, but also released as a video recording later that year. This was quickly followed in 1995 by the studio album Screw Up, which features some of the songs from Cabbage as well as some new tracks.

The band released two full-length albums, both of which were released internationally. Additionally, in Japan, they released several EP's and 3 concert videos.

The band's performances of "Skysurfers!!" and "I Call Myself Sliced Ice" were used as the opening and end credits music, respectively, for the second season of the American animated series, Skysurfer Strike Force.

The album Super Junky Alien features a bonus 1996 cover of the MTV Top of the Hour tune.

Death of Mutsumi
On February 5, 1999, Mutsumi Fukuhara committed suicide by leaping from the balcony of her apartment in Osaka, leaving behind her husband and one-year-old son. The other band members decided not to continue without her and instead moved on to other projects.

Several years after Mutsumi's death, the band released the material they were working on at the time as the E-KISS-O EP and the greatest hits Songs Are Our Universe. E-KISS-O includes three songs with Mutsumi's vocals and two instrumentals. Songs of Our Universe features two unreleased tracks and several videos.  On June 20, 2009, the remaining three members of Super Junky Monkey reunited to commemorate the tenth anniversary of Mutsumi's death with a performance at the Liquid Room in Tokyo, Japan.

Musical style
They performed and merged various styles and genres of music, including hardcore, heavy metal, hip hop, jazz, avant-garde, noise rock and funk. Influences on the band members include Steve Vai, Jaco Pastorius, Madball, Pink Floyd and Mr. Bungle. AllMusic states "A quick description of the band would be 'Japanese all-girl Faith No More or Primus'".

Members
 Mutsumi "623" Fukuhara, née Takahashi — vocals
 Keiko — guitar (later joined Ex-Girl)
 Shinobu Kawai — bass (many projects, include Tricomi)
 Matsudaaahh!! — drums (in a band called Weeee?)

Discography

CDs

Japanese release Videos
 1994.11.01　- ライブVIDEO「キャベツビデヲ」- RIOT LABEL RIVD-001  
 1995.04.21 - VIDEO「DEATHI」- Sony RECORDS SRVM444 
 1996.04.21 - ライブVIDEO「HOLY MOTHER OF MEATLOAF」- Sony RECORDS SRVM514

Japanese Compilation Albums
 Benten Bentoh - Po Po Bar
 Japanese Homegrown Vol. 1 - Another Mother (remix of Mother)
 Japanese Homegrown Vol. 2 - If - take 2 (possibly another take)
 Soy Milk Vol. 1 - Towering Man (also on E Kiss O)

References

External links
KURUGE TRAVOLTA - bassist Shinobu Kawai's site
Super Junky Monkey Official Site

All-female bands
Japanese alternative metal musical groups
Japanese avant-garde metal musical groups
1999 disestablishments in Japan
Musical groups disestablished in 1999
Funk metal musical groups